The Battle of Iskhabad, was a major engagement fought in 940 at Iskhabad, near Ray, between the Samanids, led by Abu 'Ali Chaghani, and the combined forces of the Ziyarids and Firuzanids under the Emir Vushmgir and Makan ibn Kaki. During the first phase of the battle, Vushmgir fled from the battlefield, leaving Makan behind. Many of Makan's elite units were shortly killed, while he himself was shot in the head by an arrow, and then beheaded by the victorious Samanid soldiers, who sent his head, along with many captured high-ranking Daylamite officers, to the Samanid court in Bukhara.

Sources 
 
 
 

940s conflicts
Battles involving Iran